The Watkins Skylark was an American low-wing, cantilever two-seater designed for private and club use. A large anticipated production run in 1930 ended early when the company collapsed in the Great Depression, with only five or six registered.

Design and development

The Skylark, designed by Chester Cummings,  was a cantilever, low wing, monoplane with wings tapered in plan out to semi-elliptical tips. They were built around twin box spars and were fabric covered.

The prototype, type SL-1, was powered by a  Velie M-5 engine but this was replaced in production SL-2s by a  LeBlond 60-5D. Both were five cylinder radial engines. Behind the engine the fuselage was a steel tube structure with fabric covering, flat-sided but with raised, rounded decking. The Skylark had two open cockpits in tandem, one close to the leading edge and the other over the rear of the wing.

The fuselage tapered rearwards to a conventional, angular tail. Its tailplane and elevators were together trapezoidal in plan. The fin had a cropped triangular profile and carried a rectangular, balanced rudder.

The Skylark had conventional landing gear with its mainwheels on split axles mounted, like the forward drag struts, on the lower fuselage longerons. Its shock absorbing legs were on the forward wing spars near the roots.

Operational history

The prototype Skylark was first flown in 1929, though the date is not known. By October 1929 an agreement had been signed between Watkins Aircraft and Steel Inc., a Los Angeles steel exporter, for the construction of 330 Skylarks with deliveries beginning 1 January 1930. These plans were rapidly abandoned as the depression deepened in 1930 and only five or six were completed.

Variants
 SL-1 Skylark Prototype with  Velie M-5 five cylinder radial engine. One only.
 SL-2 Skylark Production aircraft, with  LeBlond 60-5D five cylinder radial engines. At least five built.

Specifications (SL-2 Skylark )

References

Single-engined tractor aircraft
Low-wing aircraft
1920s United States sport aircraft
Aircraft first flown in 1929